Charles Edward Burtenshaw (16 October 1922 – 22 May 2013) was an English professional footballer. He played professionally for Luton Town and Gillingham between 1948 and 1953, and made 39 appearances in the Football League, scoring 5 goals.

Personal life
He was the brother of fellow professional footballer Bill Burtenshaw, whom he played alongside at both Luton Town and Gillingham.

References

1922 births
2013 deaths
English footballers
People from Brighton and Hove
Footballers from East Sussex
Association football wingers
Southwick F.C. players
Gillingham F.C. players
Luton Town F.C. players
Snowdown Colliery Welfare F.C. players
Canterbury City F.C. players
English Football League players